"Adeline" is a song by British indie rock band alt-J. It is the sixth track and third single from their third studio album, Relaxer, and was released as a digital single on 24 May 2017 by Infectious Music and Atlantic Records. The song was written by Joe Newman, Gus Unger-Hamilton and Thom Sonny Green and produced by Charlie Andrew. The band adapted a melody from the soundtrack to The Thin Red Line by Hans Zimmer, who is credited on the song as a writer. The band described the song's narrative as "a Tasmanian devil falls in love with a woman as he watches her swim."

Composition and lyrics
In an interview with NPR, the band said:

Critical reception
"Adeline" received favorable reviews from contemporary music critics. Samantha Lopez of Paste called it a "sweeping five-minute, multi-layered melody packed with classically trained instrumentals and symphonic textures."

Remix
The song was remixed by American metallic hardcore band Code Orange and was released as a single on 2 November 2017. It was released alongside a separate single for a remix of the Relaxer track "Hit Me Like That Snare", also remixed by Code Orange.

Track listing

Personnel
Credits adapted from Tidal

alt-J
Joe Newman – guitar, vocals
Gus Unger-Hamilton – keyboards, vocals
Thom Sonny Green – drums, percussion, programming

Additional musicians
London Metropolitan Orchestra – strings

Technical
Charlie Andrew – production, mixing, engineering, programming
Brett Cox – engineering
Jay Pocknell - engineering
Stefano Civetta – assistant engineering
Paul Pritchard – assistant engineering
Graeme Baldwin – assistant engineering
Dick Beetham – mastering

Artwork and design
Osamu Sato

Charts

References

External links
 

2017 singles
Alt-J songs
2017 songs
Infectious Music singles
Atlantic Records singles
Songs written by Thom Sonny Green